Congregational Church of Patchogue is a historic church at 95 East Main Street in Patchogue, New York.

Though the current church building was built in 1892, the church itself dates back to 1793 in a small building, approximately 25 by 20 feet, that was shared with some local Methodists. Even after constructing a new building in 1820, the Congregationalists and Methodists shared the church building until 1832. A third location for the Congregationalists was built on the corner of Lake Street and North Ocean Avenue in 1854. The fourth and present building was added to the National Register of Historic Places in 1993.

References

External links

Congregational Church of Patchogue Official Website

United Church of Christ churches in New York (state)
Churches on the National Register of Historic Places in New York (state)
Churches completed in 1892
19th-century United Church of Christ church buildings
Patchogue, New York
Churches in Suffolk County, New York
Clock towers in New York (state)
National Register of Historic Places in Suffolk County, New York